The Southeast Iowa Union is a weekdaily regional newspaper based in Washington, Mt. Pleasant, and Fairfield, Iowa, United States. The newspaper serves Jefferson, Henry and Washington counties.

The Fairfield edition of the Southeast Iowa Union is a participant in the Iowa Newspaper Association.

History 
The Southeast Iowa Union was launched in 2019 from the merger of three newspapers: the Washington Evening Journal, The Fairfield Ledger, and Mt. Pleasant News. On Monday, Tuesday, Wednesday, and Friday readers receive the Southeast Iowa Union. On Thursday readers receive their old local newspaper.

The Gazette bought the three newspapers in 2016. In 2021, printing operations were moved from Cedar Rapids to Des Moines, Iowa.

In July 2022, The Gazette purchased four weekly newspapers – the Star Press-Union of Belle Plaine, the Marengo Pioneer Republican of Iowa County, Williamsburg Journal Tribune, and Poweshiek County Chronicle Republican of Grinnell – from Gannett (owners of The Des Moines Register). Editorial, advertising and business functions of the four weekly newspapers, the oldest title of which dates to 1856, are based in Washington; editorial content had been overseen by the Register under previous ownership. The four newspapers cover Iowa, Poweshiek and Benton counties, and areas of western Johnson and northern Keokuk counties.

References

External links 

 Iowa Newspaper Association website 
 Southeast Iowa Union website
 Southeast Iowa Union Facebook
 Southeast Iowa Union LinkedIn
 Southeast Iowa Union Twitter

Newspapers published in Iowa
2019 establishments in Iowa